Arquimedes Nieto (born April 28, 1989, in Panama City, Panama) is a minor league baseball player who is played with the Panama national baseball team at the 2009 World Baseball Classic.

Minor league career
Nieto began his professional career in 2007, with the DSL Cardinals. He went 4–2 with a 2.73 ERA in 13 games (10 starts). In 2008, he pitched for the Batavia Muckdogs, going 6–1 with a 2.95 ERA in 15 games (nine starts). He began 2009 with the Quad Cities River Bandits.

World Baseball Classic
In the 2009 World Baseball Classic, Nieto appeared in one game, pitching two-thirds of an inning. He allowed one hit and one walk and did not give up a run. Both of the outs he pitched were strikeouts.

References

Living people
1989 births
2009 World Baseball Classic players
Sportspeople from Panama City